Marie Newman (née Klassen; born April 13, 1964) is an American politician and marketing consultant who served as the U.S. representative from Illinois's 3rd congressional district from 2021 to 2023. The district encompasses parts of southwestern Chicago as well as many of its nearby suburbs, such as Oak Lawn, Western Springs, and Lockport. Newman was elected to the United States House of Representatives as the Democratic nominee, after her narrow defeat of incumbent Dan Lipinski in the 2020 primary election. She lost to Lipinski in the Democratic primary for the same seat in 2018.

Due to redistricting as a result of the 2020 United States Census, Newman in 2022 faced a choice between running in a heavily Hispanic district she had been drawn into, or against Sean Casten in a district with the "lion's share" of her former area. Newman opted to run against Casten in the Democratic primary but was defeated.

Early life and career
Newman was born Marie Klassen in Evergreen Park, Illinois, on April 13, 1964, at the Little Company of Mary Hospital. She attended Carl Sandburg High School in Orland Park. After attending Marquette University for a year and a half, she transferred to the University of Wisconsin–Madison, where she graduated with a bachelor's degree.

Newman worked for multiple firms as an agency executive. She began her own consulting firm in 2005. She also established her own nonprofit to combat bullying after one of her children was bullied. Governor Pat Quinn appointed her to a regional anti-bullying task force and Sears Holdings Corporation asked her to establish a national anti-bullying coalition of 70 nonprofit organizations.

Newman has worked on several Democratic campaigns for public office. Between 2015 and 2017 she lobbied for gun control measures such as background checks.

U.S. House of Representatives

Elections

2018 

Newman supported Bernie Sanders in the 2016 Democratic presidential primary in Illinois and Hillary Clinton in the November general election. The day after Clinton lost, she applied to the Illinois Women's Institute for Leadership. By January 1, 2017, Newman had closed her business to turn her attention to politics full-time.

On April 10, 2017, Newman declared her candidacy for Illinois's 3rd congressional district, challenging Democratic incumbent Dan Lipinski, a member of the Blue Dog Coalition, who had held the seat since 2005, succeeding his father, who held it for 22 years. Newman ran to Lipinski's left, and was endorsed by the Human Rights Campaign, the Progressive Change Campaign Committee, Planned Parenthood, EMILY's List, the SEIU state council, National Nurses United, the Illinois Federation of Teachers, the Feminist Majority Foundation, NARAL Pro-Choice America, Democracy for America, MoveOn, and Our Revolution, and several Democratic members of Congress, including Senator Kirsten Gillibrand of New York and Representatives Luis Gutiérrez and Jan Schakowsky, both Illinois Democrats. Lipinski defeated Newman with 51.2% of the vote to her 48.8%.

2020 

Newman ran against Lipinski again in the 2020 Democratic primary. She received endorsements from Representative Alexandria Ocasio-Cortez and presidential candidates Senators Elizabeth Warren, Bernie Sanders, Cory Booker, and Kirsten Gillibrand, as well as Chicago Mayor Lori Lightfoot. The race had special significance for progressive women's groups after other candidates they supported lost primary races earlier in March in Texas and the principal women candidates for the Democratic presidential nomination had ended their campaigns.

On March 17, 2020, Newman narrowly defeated Lipinski in the Democratic primary with 47.26% of the vote to his 44.72%. Her victory ended the Lipinski family's 38-year hold on the district. Bill Lipinski won the seat in 1983, when it was numbered as the 5th district (it has been the 3rd since 1993), and handed it to Dan in 2005.

On November 3, Newman won the general election, defeating Republican Will County Supervisor Mike Fricilone. With 88% of the vote counted, she led by about 30,000 votes, and had received about 55% of the vote.

2022 

In October 2021, Democrats in the Illinois legislature passed a new congressional map that radically changed Newman's district. The map placed Newman's home into a district with Representative Jesús "Chuy" García, who represents a majority-Hispanic district. Newman announced that she would run in the redrawn 6th District, which overlaps her original district. She thus challenged incumbent Representative Sean Casten in the 2022 Democratic primary. In the redrawn 6th district, 41% of voters are from Newman's former district and 23% are from Casten's former district, according to calculations by Daily Kos. On June 28, 2022, Newman lost the primary to Casten.

Tenure
In January 2021, Newman voted to impeach President Donald Trump.

In November 2021, Newman voted for the Build Back Better Act, which passed the House of Representatives.

House Ethics Committee review
In 2021, the House Ethics Committee launched a review into Newman after she was accused of having signed a contract promising Iymen Chehade, a pro-Palestinian activist and potential primary opponent, a job in her congressional office in exchange for Chehade's not entering the primary; other documents alleged to be included in the review also stipulated that Newman adopt several policy positions with respect to the Israeli-Palestinian conflict. 

Federal Elections Commission filings show that Newman hired Chehade as a foreign policy advisor through her campaign, paying him $54,000 since the second half of 2021, more than twice what other employees working similar jobs were paid; Chehade was Newman's highest-paid employee. In her contract with him, Newman also agreed to adopt specific stances with respect to BDS-related legislation and aid to Israel, and to refuse to work with a number of pro-Israel organizations, such as the Jewish National Fund.

On October 15, 2021, the Office of Congressional Ethics voted unanimously that there was reason to believe that Newman's agreement with Chehade constituted a de facto bribe and to refer the matter to the House Ethics Committee. Newman's representatives responded that Newman "cooperate[d] completely with the review" but that the OCE had "prejudged the matter from the beginning", also making it clear this was "political theatre". 

On February 3, 2022, FACT filed a complaint with the Federal Elections Commission on the grounds that Newman's continued payments to Chehade, a witness in the Congressional investigations, interfered with the investigation. Newman denied wrongdoing, calling the complaint politically motivated; CREW said that the continued payments raised "serious ethics questions".

In the course of the investigation, it was revealed that Newman had made a similar contract guaranteeing a job to another person, Shadin Maali, who had previously conducted political outreach for Chehade. It was later learned that the source was a member of the opponent's campaign and documentation was never produced.

The matter was closed in the late summer of 2022 after the primary election. No investigative subcommittee investigation was empaneled because it was not deemed needed and the matter was terminated with no violation cited.

Committee assignments 

 Committee on Transportation and Infrastructure
 Subcommittee on Highways and Transit
 Subcommittee on Railroads, Pipelines, and Hazardous Materials
 Committee on Small Business
 Subcommittee on Contracting and Workforce
 Subcommittee on Innovation, Entrepreneurship, and Workforce Development

Caucus memberships 
Congressional Progressive Caucus
 House Pro-Choice Caucus

Political positions 

Newman represents what has long been the most conservative district of the eight that divide Chicago. Described as "ancestrally Democratic, culturally conservative, multiethnic and viscerally patriotic", the 3rd is the only Chicago-based district with a Cook Partisan Voting Index lower than D+15. Newman identifies as a progressive Democrat. She supports abortion rights, gun control, a $15 minimum wage, and a Green New Deal. Her campaigns were supported by Justice Democrats, an organization that funds progressive candidates, in both 2018 and 2020. The Sunrise Movement supported her campaign in 2020.

LGBTQ+ rights 
Newman also supports the Equality Act, saying, "Without the Equality Act, this nation will never live up to its principles of freedom and equality." She says that she entered politics to make the world a better place for her transgender daughter. After Republican freshman Marjorie Taylor Greene attacked the bill as "disgusting, immoral, and evil" on the House floor, Newman hung a Transgender Pride flag outside her Washington office, which is directly across from Greene's.

Israel 
Newman was one of eight Democrats to vote against the funding of the Iron Dome in Israel. An ongoing House Ethics Committee investigation into an alleged bribe revealed that Newman had signed a contract agreeing to take specific positions with respect to foreign aid to Israel; Newman has called the investigation "politically motivated" and "completely meritless".

Electoral history

2018

2020

2022

Personal life 
Newman lives in La Grange, west of Chicago, with her husband, Jim. They married in 1996 and have two children.

Newman's daughter is transgender, and Newman has spoken about how the lack of support for transgender people influenced her to run for office.

See also
Women in the United States House of Representatives

Notes

References

External links

|-

1964 births
21st-century American women
American abortion-rights activists
American gun control activists
American LGBT rights activists
American nonprofit executives
Democratic Party members of the United States House of Representatives from Illinois
Female members of the United States House of Representatives
Living people
People from La Grange, Illinois
Politicians from Chicago
Progressivism in the United States
University of Wisconsin–Madison alumni
Women in advertising
Women nonprofit executives